Namibia competed at the 2012 Summer Olympics in London, United Kingdom from July 27 to August 12, 2012. This was the nation's sixth consecutive appearance at the Olympics.

Namibian National Olympic Committee sent a total of 9 athletes to the Games, 5 men and 4 women, to compete in 5 sports. Three Namibian athletes had competed in Beijing, including marathon runner Beata Naigambo, the oldest member of the team, at age 32, and trap shooter Gaby Ahrens, who became the nation's first female flag bearer at the opening ceremony. Namibia also marked its Olympic return in freestyle wrestling after an eight-year absence.

Namibia, however, failed to win a single Olympic medal for the fourth consecutive time.

Background
Namibia made its debut at the 1992 Summer Olympics in Barcelona and appeared at all subsequent Games before the 2012 Summer Olympics in London - the country's sixth Olympics. Namibia sent its greatest number of athletes - 11 - to the 2000 Summer Olympics in Sydney. The country's most successful athlete is 100 and 200 metres runner Frankie Fredericks who won silver in both disciplines at Namibia's inaugural Olympics in Barcelona in 1992, and at the Atlanta Olympics four years later. Fredericks, the only Namibian athlete to win an Olympic medal as of 2012, missed the Sydney Olympics in 2000 due to an Achilles injury and was unsuccessful in his attempts to win further medals at his final Olympics in Athens in 2004.

Nine athletes were selected by Namibia to participate at the 2012 Olympics. Trap shooter Gaby Ahrens bore the flag for the country at the opening ceremony of the Games. She was joined in the Namibian Olympic team by cyclists Marc Bassingthwaighte and Dan Craven; runners Tjipekapora Herunga, Helalia Johannes and Beata Naigambo; boxers Mujandjae Kasuto and Jonas Matheus; and wrestler Naatele Sem Shilimela.

Athletics

Namibian athletes have so far achieved qualifying standards in the following athletics events (up to a maximum of 3 athletes in each event at the 'A' Standard, and 1 at the 'B' Standard):

Women

Boxing

Namibia has qualified two boxers.
Men

Cycling

Namibia has qualified the following cyclists for the Games.

Road

Mountain biking

Shooting

Namibia has earned one quota place for shooting events;

Women

Wrestling

Sem Shilimela represented Namibia in London. Shilimela received a bye into the last 16, where he faced Dzhamal Otarsultanov of Russia, losing 0–3 on points. Shilimela received a bye through the first round of the repechage, then again lost 0–3 on points to North Korean Yang Kyong-il in the second round.

Men's freestyle

References

Nations at the 2012 Summer Olympics
2012
Olympics